Blood Brothers is a 1993 four-part Australian documentary series that tells the stories of three different Aboriginal Australian men and an Aboriginal ceremony.

Overview

Broken English
"Broken English" is about Arrernte man Rupert Max Stuart who has always maintained his innocence of the rape and murder of a young white girl in 1958. He spent 14 years in prison and faced the gallows nine times for a crime he says he didn't commit. His story was the basis for the 2002 film Black and White.

Running time - 55 minutes.

Freedom Ride
"Freedom Ride" is about Charles Perkins, one of the first Aboriginal people to graduate from university. He was also the leader of the 1965 freedom rides that challenged segregation practices in northern NSW.

Running time - 54 minutes.

From Little Things, Big Things Grow
"From Little Things, Big Things Grow" is about the life of Kev Carmody, whose 1989 album Pillars of Society established him as a prominent Australian protest musician.

Running time - 53 minutes.

Jardiwarnpa - A Warlpiri Fire Ceremony
"Jardiwarnpa - A Warlpiri Fire Ceremony" is about the staging of a Warlpiri Fire Ceremony over several weeks and involving hundreds of people at Yuendumu in the Northern Territory.

Running time - 57 minutes.

References

External links
Blood Brothers - National Film and Sound Archive

1993 films
1993 documentary films
Australian documentary films
Films set in the Northern Territory
Films set in New South Wales
Documentary films about Aboriginal Australians
1990s English-language films